This article describes the qualifying of the 2018–19 Women's EHF Champions League.

Draw
The draw was held on 27 June 2018 in Vienna, Austria. The eight teams were split in two groups and played a semifinal and final to determine the last participants. Matches were played on 8 and 9 September 2018. The matches from each tournament were played in one venue with two semi-finals, where teams from Pot 4 met teams from Pot 1 and teams from Pot 3 will faced teams from Pot 2, followed by finals. The right to organize the qualification tournaments was also drawn.

Seedings
The seedings were announced on 20 June 2018.

Qualification tournament 1
MKS Lublin hosted the tournament.

Bracket

Semifinals

Third place game

Final

Qualification tournament 2
Podravka Koprivnica hosted the tournament.

Bracket

Semifinals

Third place game

Final

References

External links
Official website

Qualifying